The TG4 Young Traditional Musician of the Year Award is given annually as part of Gradam Ceoil TG4. The award is to recognise the role of young and developing musicians in traditional Irish music and to ensure the future of traditions.

The following is a list of the recipients of the award.
 1998 – June Nic Cormaic, County Sligo
 1999 – Aogán Ó Loingsigh, Cork
 2000 – Méabh O'Hare, Belfast
 2001 – Conor McKeon (musician), Dublin
 2002 – Liam O'Connor, Dublin
 2003 – Ciarán Ó Maonaigh, Donegal
 2004 – Edel Fox, County Clare
 2005 – Seán McKeon, Dublin
 2006 – Michelle Mulcahy, County Limerick
 2007 – Fiachna Ó Mongáin, County Mayo
 2008 – Martin Tourish, County Donegal
 2009 – Conor McEvoy, County Meath
 2010 – Aidan O'Donnell, County Donegal
 2011 – Pádraic Keane, County Galway
 2012 – Caoimhín Ó Fearghail, County Waterford
 2013 – Dónal McCague, County Monaghan
 2014 – Bryan O'Leary, County Kerry
 2015 – Maitiú Ó Casaide, Dublin
 2016 – Órlaith McAuliffe, London
 2017 – Liam O'Brien, County Clare
 2018 – Clare Friel, County Donegal
 2019 – Conor Connolly, County Galway
 2020 - Sharon Howley, County Clare

References

Traditional music
Irish music awards